Orlando Lourenco (born 15 September 1964 in Gwelo) is a former tennis player from Zimbabwe.

Lourenco represented his native country at the 1984 Summer Olympics in Los Angeles, where he was defeated in the first round by France's Guy Forget. Lourenco reached his highest singles ATP-ranking on 5 November 1990, when he became world No. 853.

Lourenco participated in eight Davis Cup ties for Zimbabwe from 1983-1990, posting a 9-4 record in singles and a 1-2 record in doubles.

He now teaches tennis at the Champions Club in Chattanooga, Tennessee.

External links

1964 births
Sportspeople from Gweru
Zimbabwean male tennis players
Tennis players at the 1984 Summer Olympics
Olympic tennis players of Zimbabwe
Living people